Lars Mikael Myrberg (born 23 November 1964 in Stockholm) was a Swedish boxer who won a light welterweight bronze medal at the 1988 Summer Olympics.

1988 Olympic record
Below is the record of Lars Myrberg, a Swedish light welterweight boxer who competed at the 1988 Seoul Olympics:

 Round of 64: defeated Handhal al-Harithy (Oman) referee stopped contest in first round
 Round of 32: defeated Ahmed Khanji (Syria) by decision, 4-1
 Round of 16: Defeated Howard Grant (Canada) by decision, 4-1
 Quarterfinal: defeated Humberto Rodriguez (Mexico) by first-round knockout
 Semifinal: lost to Grahame Cheney (Australia) by decision, 0-5 (was awarded bronze medal)

Professional career
Myrberg turned pro in 1996 and fought only one bout. He defeated Shaba Edwards by technical knockout in a bout held in Denmark. Myrberg retired with a record of 1-0-0.

References
 
 sports-reference

1964 births
Olympic boxers of Sweden
Boxers at the 1988 Summer Olympics
Welterweight boxers
Living people
Olympic bronze medalists for Sweden
Sportspeople from Stockholm
Olympic medalists in boxing
Swedish male boxers
Medalists at the 1988 Summer Olympics
20th-century Swedish people
Djurgårdens IF boxers